Orchestina longipes is a spider species found in Italy.

See also 
 List of Oonopidae species

References

External links 

Oonopidae
Spiders of Europe
Endemic arthropods of Italy
Spiders described in 1922